Virginia Ruano Pascual and Paola Suárez were the defending champions, but Suarez retired from the sport on September 1, 2007, and only Ruano Pascual competed that year.

Chia-jung Chuang and Su-wei Hsieh won in the final 7–6(3), 6–3, against Xinyun Han and Xu Yifan.

Seeds

Draw

Draw

External links
Tournament Draws

China Open
2007 China Open (tennis)